Igor Inocêncio de Oliveira (born 20 April 1998), known as Igor Inocêncio or just Igor, is a Brazilian footballer who plays as a right back for Ceará.

Career statistics

References

External links

1998 births
Living people
People from João Pessoa, Paraíba
Brazilian footballers
Association football defenders
Campeonato Brasileiro Série A players
Campeonato Brasileiro Série B players
Auto Esporte Clube players
Águia de Marabá Futebol Clube players
Clube Esportivo Lajeadense players
Esporte Clube Juventude players
Coritiba Foot Ball Club players
Ceará Sporting Club players
Centro Sportivo Alagoano players
Sportspeople from Paraíba